Palmitoyl pentapeptide-4 (palmitoyl pentapeptide-3 before 2006) is a matrikine used in anti-wrinkle cosmetics. It was launched in 2000 as an active ingredient for the personal care industry under the trade name Matrixyl by the French cosmetic active ingredient manufacturer Sederma SAS.

Chemistry
Palmitoyl pentapeptide-4 (Pal-Lys-Thr-Thr-Lys-Ser = Pal-KTTKS) contains 5 amino acids linked to a 16-carbon aliphatic chain for improving the penetration of the molecule through the lipid structures of the skin. It is a matrikine. Matrikines are messenger peptides capable of regulating cell activities by interacting with their specific receptors. They activate certain genes involved in the process of extracellular matrix renewal and cell proliferation. By activating the neosynthesis of extracellular matrix macromolecules, palmitoyl pentapeptide-4 provides an anti-wrinkle effect. Studies (in vitro and in vivo) demonstrating the anti-wrinkle efficacy of this peptide have been conducted and published by Sederma and by independent organisations.

References

Peptides
Cosmetics chemicals